Sulpicia was an ancient Roman poet who was active during the reign of the emperor Domitian  (r. AD 81–96).  She is mostly known through two poems of Martial; she is also mentioned by Ausonius, Sidonius Apollinaris, and Fulgentius.  A seventy-line hexameter poem and two lines of iambic trimeter attributed to Sulpicia survive; the hexameters are now generally thought to have been a fourth- or fifth-century imitation of Sulpicia.  Judging by the ancient references to her and the single surviving couplet of her poetry, Sulpicia wrote love poetry discussing her desire for her husband, and was known for her frank sexuality.

Life
Little is known of Sulpicia's life.  She was married to a man named Calenus, likely a patron of Martial, who is the source of most of what is known about her.  Martial mentions her in two poems, and praises her faithfulness. His epigram 10.38 suggests that Sulpicia and Calenus were married for at least 15 years, at which point, judging by ancient Roman marriage norms, Sulpicia would have been at least 30.  The poem is usually read as a poem of consolation after Sulpicia's death, though Amy Richlin argues that it might instead have been written about Sulpicia and Calenus having divorced, and Edward Courtney suggests that it is celebrating an anniversary.  If it was written as a consolation for Sulpicia's death, she probably died between 95 and 98 AD.

As Sulpicia is also the name of the only other Roman woman poet about whom any substantial information has survived, Thomas Hubbard suggests that her name was a pseudonym borrowed from the earlier Sulpicia.

Poetry
Sulpicia seems to have written poetry that was erotic or satirical.  She is the only woman known from antiquity who was associated with a comic genre.  Judging by the surviving testimonia on Sulpicia, she openly discussed her sexual desire for her husband; this outspoken centring of female sexual desire is extremely unusual amongst ancient women poets.  By contrast with the male love poets of ancient Rome, however, Sulpicia portrays her desire only within the context of her marriage.

Two lines of iambic trimeter attributed to Sulpicia are quoted by a scholiast on Juvenal.  These lines are generally accepted as the only surviving fragment of Sulpicia's poetry.  The manuscript with the scholion is now lost, but it was quoted by Giorgio Valla in his 1486 edition of Juvenal.  The text quoted by Valla is attributed to "Sulpicius", and was first identified as a fragment of Sulpicia by the 16th century scholar Pierre Pithou based on the mention of Calenus.  The text transmitted by Valla is corrupt and the meaning continues to be debated, though the lines apparently come from one of the erotic poems about Calenus that are mentioned by Martial.

Sulpiciae Conquestio

A seventy-line hexameter poem on the expulsion from Rome of Greek philosophers by Domitian was for a long time attributed to Sulpicia.  The poem was preserved in an anthology from the early fifth century.  The only manuscript known to have survived antiquity, the Epigrammata Bobiensia, preserved at Bobbio Abbey in northern Italy, is now lost; the modern text of the poem derives from four copies of a transcript made of the manuscript in the late fifth century.  The poem, known as the Sulpiciae Conquestio (Sulpicia's Complaint) was first printed in 1498, and its authorship remained unquestioned until the second half of the 19th century.  In 1868,  argued that the poem was a 15th-century composition; in 1873 Emil Baehrens was the first to suggest it was a work of late antiquity.  Modern scholars generally consider that the work was not by Sulpicia, and was composed in the fourth or fifth century AD.  The only information about Sulpicia that the Conquestio adds to that transmitted by Martial is the mention of three metres that she wrote in: hendecasyllables, iambic trimeters, and scazons.  It is unclear why the poem imitated Sulpicia, as she is otherwise only associated with love poetry, rather than the political satire of the Conquestio.

Reception
Martial compares Sulpicia's poetry, along with her conduct, favourably to Sappho. Her poetry seems to have continued to be known and well thought of into the fifth century – she is mentioned alongside Plato, Cicero, Martial, and Juvenal by Ausonius and Sidonius Apollinaris.  She is also mentioned by the mythographer Fulgentius, though it is unclear whether he had read her work or only knew of her through Ausonius.   Sulpicia's poetry was well known enough for a scholiast on Juvenal to quote, and for the author of the Conquestio to adopt her identity.  During this period, Sulpicia was apparently best known for the sexual nature of her poetry.  As all but two lines of her poetry are now lost, it is impossible to judge her writing today.

Notes

References

Works cited

External links
  – Text and translation of Sulpicia and translated testimonia.
  – Translation with notes.

1st-century Roman poets
1st-century women writers
1st-century Roman women
Ancient Roman women writers
Ancient women poets
Ancient Roman satirists
Silver Age Latin writers
Sulpicii